Diploglossus is a genus of New World diploglossid lizards, with 20 described species, commonly known as galliwasps.

Several former Diploglossus species were moved to the genus Siderolamprus in 2021.

Geographic range
Species of the genus Diploglossus are found in South America and parts of the West Indies. One species, D. bilobatus, is found in Central America, but is sometimes placed in the distinct genus Mesoamericus in the subfamily Siderolamprinae.

Species
The following species are recognized as being valid.
Diploglossus bilobatus  – O'Shaughnessy's galliwasp
Diploglossus delasagra  – Cuban pale-necked galliwasp, Cuban galliwasp
Diploglossus fasciatus  – banded galliwasp
Diploglossus garridoi  – Cuban small-eared galliwasp
Diploglossus lessonae  – Brazilian galliwasp
Diploglossus microlepis  – small-lipped galliwasp
Diploglossus millepunctatus  – dotted galliwasp
Diploglossus monotropis  
Diploglossus montisserrati  – Montserrat galliwasp
Diploglossus nigropunctatus  – Cuban spotted galliwasp
Diploglossus pleii  – Puerto Rican galliwasp

Nota bene: A binomial authority in parentheses indicates that the species was originally described in a genus other than Diploglossus.

References

Further reading
Wiegmann AFA (1834). Herpetologia Mexicana, seu descriptio amphibiorum Novae Hispaniae, quae itineribus comitis de Sack, Ferdinandi Deppe et Chr. Guil. Schiede in Museum Zoologicum Berolinense pervenerunt. Pars prima, saurorum species amplectens. Adiecto systematis saurorum prodromo, additsque multis in hunc amphibiorum ordinem observationibus. Berlin: C.G. Lüderitz. vi + 54 pp. + Plates I-X. (Diploglossus, new genus, p. 36). (in Latin).

Diploglossus
Lizards of South America
Lizards of Central America
Lizards of the Caribbean
Lizards of North America
Lizard genera
Taxa named by Arend Friedrich August Wiegmann